Noble is an unincorporated community in Jay County, Indiana, in the United States. It took its name from Noble Township, Jay County, Indiana.

References

Unincorporated communities in Jay County, Indiana
Unincorporated communities in Indiana